The horseshoe whip snake (Hemorrhois hippocrepis) is a species of snake in the family Colubridae . The species is native to southwestern Europe and northern Africa.

Description
Adults of H. hippocrepis may attain a total length (including tail) of 1.5 m (5 feet). Its body is slender, and its head is wider than its neck. The eye is large, with a round pupil, and with a row of small scales below it. The smooth dorsal scales are arranged in 25-29 rows, and the ventrals number 220–258. Dorsally, it has a series of large spots which are either blackish or dark brown edged with black. There is a series of alternating smaller dark spots on each side. The lighter ground color between the spots may be yellowish, olive, or reddish. The dark spots are closely spaced, giving the appearance of a dark snake with a light pattern resembling a chain or a series of X's. There is a light horseshoe-shaped mark on the neck and back of head.

Geographic range
H. hippocrepis is found in Algeria, Morocco and Tunisia in North Africa, and in southern and central Portugal, southern, eastern and central Spain, Gibraltar, southern Sardinia and Pantelleria Island in Europe. In the island locations, it may have been introduced. Since the early 2000s it has been reported from Balearic Islands of Mallorca, Ibiza and Formentera. It could have been introduced there by way of old olive trees imported from mainland Spain. The species is thriving there and becomes larger than on the mainland.

Habitat
The natural habitats of H. hippocrepis are Mediterranean-type shrubby vegetation, rocky areas, rocky shores, sandy shores, arable land, pastureland, plantations, rural gardens, and urban areas.

Reproduction
H. hippocrepis is oviparous.

Subspecies
Two subspecies are recognized as being valid, including the nominotypical subspecies.
Hemorrhois hippocrepis hippocrepis 
Hemorrhois hippocrepis nigrescens  Pantelleria

Nota bene: A trinomial authority in parentheses indicates that the subspecies was originally described in a genus other than Hemorrhois.

Conservation status
The horseshoe whip snake is assessed as being of "Least Concern" by the International Union for Conservation of Nature in its Red List of Threatened Species. Its population trend is thought to be steady, and it is able to adapt to modified habitats. Threats it faces include being run over by traffic, poisoned by agricultural chemicals and being captured for use by local snake charmers.

See also
List of reptiles of Italy

References

Further reading
Cattaneo A (1985). "Il colubro ferro di cavallo dell'Isola di Pantelleria: Coluber hippocrepis nigrescens subsp. nova (Reptilia Squamata Colubridae)". Atti della Società italiana di Scienze naturali del Museo civico di Storia naturale di Milano 126 (3-4): 165–184. (Coluber hippocrepis nigrescens, new subspecies). (in Italian, with an abstract in English). 
Linnaeus C (1758). Systema naturæ per regna tria naturæ, secundum classes, ordines, genera, species, cum characteribus, differentiis, synonymis, locis. Tomus I. Editio Decima, Reformata. Stockholm: L. Salvius. 824 pp. (Coluber hippocrepis, new species, p. 226). (in Latin).
Utiger U, Helfenberger N, Schätti B, Schmidt C, Ruf M, Ziswiler V (2002). "Molecular Systematics and Phylogeny of Old World Ratsnakes, Elaphe Auct., and Related Genera (Reptilia, Squamata, Colubridae)". Russian Journal of Herpetology 9 (2): 105–124. (Hemorrhois hippocrepis). (in English).

Hemorrhois
Reptiles of Europe
Reptiles of North Africa
Fauna of the Iberian Peninsula
Reptiles described in 1758
Taxa named by Carl Linnaeus
Taxonomy articles created by Polbot